Temnothorax is a genus of ants in the subfamily Myrmicinae. It contains more than 380 species.

Biology
The workers of Temnothorax species are generally small. Colonies are typically monogynous, although facultative polygyny has been documented in several species. Colony populations are usually quite small, often with less than 100 workers. However, several studies have found colonies of some species to be widely dispersed with several to many satellite nests. Many species are arboreal, living within hollow stems, old beetle or termite galleries, or in galls. Temnothorax species appear to be trophic generalists, feeding on a wide variety of scavenged items, including the elaiosomes of seeds. None have been documented to be active or aggressive predators.

Phylogenetics
Recent molecular phylogenetic studies show that the genera Chalepoxenus, Myrmoxenus and Protomognathus are nested within Temnothorax, and that the latter is distinct from the more distantly related genera Formicoxenus, Leptothorax and Harpagoxenus. Species in these 'satellite' genera live as social parasites within the nests of other species of Temnothorax.

Social behaviors 
As Temnothorax colonies are small and easy to maintain in a laboratory environment, they are often used to study social behaviour in ants.Temnothorax have been used to show displays of social structures through communication, colony responsibility, and influence.

Communication among ants has been observed and assumed to be entirely influenced through substrate-bound odor cues. However, this previous determined social factor has been disproved among the  Temnothorax as recorded in the study conducted by Sean R Bowens, Daniel P Glatt, and Stephen C Pratt. Their study observed the navigational influences during emigration. The study consisted of forcing emigration in a colony to a new nest and change the visual and odor cues to the old nest. The new nest was rotated 60 degrees around the old nest in order to keep the visual cues but expel odor cues. The ants were then observed by their success in finding their way back to the old nest. When the odor cues were obstructed but the visual cues were not the ants did not have a problem locating the old nest. The study then changed to remove both the odor and visual cues. When this was done the ants showed disoriented behavior when searching for the old nest. Lastly, the study observed the ants when the visual cue was obstructed but not the odor cues. It was discovered that when the visual cues were obstructed and the ant had only odor cues  to use for navigation the ants continued to display disoriented behavior and not only could not find the old nest, they walked in the opposite direction from it. This has led the study to conclude that among Temnothorax this species relies on visual cues rather than odor cues, and it is now assumed that odor cues are simply used to mark territory.

Among the Temnothorax it has been studied as to how effectively the queen of a colony can dominate the reproductive decisions of her workers. In a study completed by Elisabeth Brunner, Johannes Kroiss, Andreas Trindl, and Jürgen Heinze, the queens of different colonies among similar species were observed in their influence over the reproduction of male workers; and whether or not the queen was manipulating their reproduction through active suppression or by implanting an honest signal of pheromones to broadcast fertility status. The study looked at queens in a mixed-species colonies and in colonies of the same species and at the cast-specific patterns of the cuticular hydrocarbons present. In the mixed- species colonies the queens were not able to completely suppress the reproduction of the male workers. In the colonies consisting of the same species the queen was able to suppress the male workers. It could be that the chemical profiles of  the cuticular hydrocarbons differentiated between the queens of separate species. However, since the queens were still able to suppress the male workers somewhat, this supports the hypothesis that queens use an honest signal to manipulate the reproduction of male workers.

In a study completed by  Anna Dornhaus, Jo-Anne Holley, and Nigel R. Franks, the communal responsibilities within the colonies of Temnothorax were observed to determine if the size of a colony influences the division of labor among workers. By studying 11 colonies of both large and small population sizes (a small colony to consist of 200 to 400 individuals and a large colony to consist of 500 to 700 individuals) with approximately less than 1100 individually marked worker ants the researchers were able to determine how tasks were divided and the proportion of how many workers were active or inactive in the completion of tasks. The researchers charted seven different task required to be done during the emigration process from an old nest to a new one: scouting, brood transport, adult transport,  collection of food which was separated into two tasks for collecting dead flies (Drosophila) and collecting honey solution, collection of sand materials for wall building, and the actual task of wall building. It was observed that between the sizes of the large and small colonies the ratio of active and non-active works was consistent, with the larger colonies having a slightly higher ratio of active workers but not enough to be statistically significant. It was also observed that among active and inactive workers it was consistent that usually less than 25% and never more than 50% of the workers were active. This could be that the non-active workers were completing tasks that were not being observed. Specialization of tasks was also not determined by colony size. However of the active workers it was shown that there was a disproportion of the rate at which active workers complete tasks with typically a few individuals doing more of the work than the other active workers. These ratios were also consistent in times when either a high or low phase of activity was required to complete emigration to the new nest.

Species 
Temnothorax albipennis
Temnothorax americanus
 Temnothorax corsicus
Temnothorax curvispinosus
Temnothorax gallae
Temnothorax lichtensteini
Temnothorax nylanderi
Temnothorax pilagens
Temnothorax rugatulus
Temnothorax unifasciatus
Temnothorax exilis

Notes

References

Further reading

External links 

Myrmicinae
Ant genera